Acheron (Asheron) is a Niger–Congo language in the Talodi family of Kordofan, Sudan.

Acheron derives from the Arabic word aɟɟur-uun which means "innocent people", it was later "indigenised as acʊrʊn" (Stevenson 1956: 102) and turned into aʃərɔn. The autoethonym in Acheron is wɑ-rəmɛ for the people and ɡə-rəmɛ for the language.

The number of active speakers is estimated to be 9.800. This number includes the community members and "diaspora speakers" in other Sudanese towns and abroad.

Nouns

Further reading
Norton, Russell. 1995. Variation and change in the phonology of Asheron. M.A. Dissertation, University of Essex.
Norton, Russell. 2000. The noun classes of Asheron. Occasional Papers in the study of Sudanese Languages 8:23-55.
Norton, Russell. 2013. The Acheron vowel system: a participatory approach. In Roger Blench & Thilo Schadeberg (eds), Nuba Mountain Language Studies. Cologne: Rüdiger Köppe. pp. 195–217.

References

External links
 Listen to a sample of Acheron from Global Recordings Network

Severely endangered languages
Talodi languages